Ciara Kathleen Michel (born 2 July 1985) is a British/American volleyball player who plays as a middle blocker. Born in Taunton, Somerset Michel learned to play volleyball in Miami, Florida after her parents moved there when she was aged 10. In Miami she attended Palmer Trinity School, and graduated in 2003. Here she became a star volleyball player and has been credited with starting a rich volleyball tradition at the school. She later became a student athlete at the University of Miami from 2004 to 2008, where she was captain, and still holds the records for most career blocks.

After university, she went on to play in Australia, for the University Blues of Victoria, while completing a master's degree from the University of Melbourne. She played her first two professional seasons for Alemannia Aachen in Germany (2010–2012).

Michel was selected to represent Great Britain in the 2012 London Olympics where she led her team to a history-making win over Algeria. The team finished in a tie for 8th position.

The next season she joined VT Aurubis, Hamburg.

In May 2013, she signed with Yamamay Busto Arsizio near Milan, Italy, making her the first British player in history to compete in the CEV Champions League. The team won 2nd place in the CEV Champions League in 2015.

She spent the 2015–16 season in Turkey's top division for Bursa Büyükşehir Belediyespor, competing in the CEV Challenge Cup.

She then moved to French first division side  for the 2016–2017 season, before transferring to another French first division side, ASPTT Mulhouse for the 2017–18 season.

References

External links
 and 

1985 births
Living people
English women's volleyball players
Volleyball players at the 2012 Summer Olympics
Olympic volleyball players of Great Britain
Sportspeople from Taunton
Middle blockers